Sidney Earle Smith,  (March 9, 1897 – March 17, 1959) was an academic and Canada's Secretary of State for External Affairs in the government of Prime Minister John Diefenbaker.

Early life and education
Born and raised on Nova Scotia's Port Hood Island, Smith grew up speaking both English and Gaelic. He received a B.A. and an M.A. from the University of King's College, followed by an LL.B. from Dalhousie University.

Career
Smith became a lawyer and a professor of law, lecturing at Osgoode Hall Law School and then at Dalhousie University. In 1929, he became dean of Dalhousie's law school.  In 1934, he left the Maritimes to become president of the University of Manitoba.  In 1945, he was appointed the president of the University of Toronto. He remained in that role for twelve years, overseeing a major period of the university's expansion.

Politics
A strong Conservative in the Red Tory tradition, Smith became a prominent member of the Progressive Conservative Party. In 1956, he was considered a possibility for the party's leadership, but decided not to run, disappointing those in the party establishment who wished to prevent the populist John Diefenbaker from becoming leader.

After Diefenbaker won a surprise minority government in 1957, Smith was appointed as Secretary of State for External Affairs. Despite Smith's brilliance and popularity in academia, his success in this new role was limited. After holding the position for two years, he died suddenly of a stroke in 1959.

Posthumous recognition
Sidney Smith Hall, the central building of the Faculty of Arts and Science at the University of Toronto, is named after him.

Election results

References

Martin Friedland, The University of Toronto: A History. Toronto: University of Toronto Press, 2002.

External links

Sidney Earle Smith archival papers held at the University of Toronto Archives and Records Management Services
Sidney Earle Smith fonds s held at Library and Archives Canada

1897 births
1959 deaths
Canadian legal scholars
Dalhousie University alumni
Deans of law schools in Canada
Members of the House of Commons of Canada from Ontario
Members of the King's Privy Council for Canada
Members of the United Church of Canada
People from Inverness County, Nova Scotia
Presidents of the University of Toronto
Progressive Conservative Party of Canada MPs
Canadian people of Scottish descent
University of Manitoba
Schulich School of Law alumni
Canadian Secretaries of State for External Affairs